Czerna  is a village in the administrative district of Gmina Krzeszowice, within Kraków County, Lesser Poland Voivodeship, in southern Poland. The village is located in the historical region of Lesser Poland.

The village has a population of 1,252.

Sights
The local landmark is the Monastery of Discalced Carmelites with the Saint Elijah church founded by noblewoman . There is also a grave of Polish General of the November Uprising , funded by his friend, General Stanisław Klicki.

Demographics
Religions: Roman Catholicism, Jehovah's Witnesses (1%).

In 1870, the village had a population of 642.

See also
 Raphael Kalinowski

References

Villages in Kraków County